Beemans gum (originally Beeman's Gum, see image at right) is a chewing gum formulated by Ohio physician Edward E. Beeman in the late 19th century. It originally contained pepsin, but no longer does.

History
Beeman originally claimed the gum contained pepsin powder that would improve digestion. The product became a part of the American Chicle Company in 1898, and continued on after the purchase of American Chicle by Warner-Lambert in 1962. Production ceased in 1978 due to lagging sales. In 1985 the brand was revived in a nostalgia campaign, as an ordinary chewing gum without the medical claims, marketed along with Clove and Black Jack chewing gums.

The original wrapper had a pig logo, but was later replaced with a logo featuring Beeman's name in scroll and his portrait. The current wrapper design has a white and red background with white and black lettering. Beemans is sporadically produced by Cadbury Adams as a nostalgia gum, along with the other historic gums Clove and Black Jack.  In 2015 the company announced it would no longer produce any of these popular gums. Since then, because of regular demand, all three brands have been reintroduced. In 2019, Gerrit J. Verburg, one of America's largest candy importers, purchased the exclusive rights and resumed production. The gum is no longer made in the United States but rather in Morocco. Packaging is similar to the "original" as is the formula. The gum is sold sporadically in the USA by the Gerrit J. Verburg Co.

The gum is prominently featured in major movies The Right Stuff, Hot Shots!, The Rocketeer (in which the gum serves a key plot element), and Indiana Jones and the Kingdom of the Crystal Skull, used in the latter for character Mutt Williams (Shia Labeouf) in Indy home scene. Most recently the gum features on the inventor's workbench of young Frank Walker in Disney's Tomorrowland, as Frank is working on his homemade rocket jet-pack.

Medical claims

The "lucky" gum of pilots is a superstition perhaps based in the original product's unsubstantiated claim of preventing seasickness, but applied to flight airsickness.  Chewing any type of gum is thought to promote
equalizing pressure in the ears.

The current product no longer contains any pepsin or chicle, and instead follows the ordinary modern chewing gum recipe of sweetened and flavored synthetic gum base.  The original medical claim that the chewing gum "cures indigestion and sea-sickness" was never substantiated and would not be permitted today by food and drug regulations dating to the 1930s.  Indeed, the presence of pepsin in the throat is known to be injurious to throat tissues.

Advertisements

References

External links
 Verburg Website

Cadbury Adams brands
Chewing gum
Mondelez International brands